Manathe Vellitheru is a 1994 Indian Malayalam-language film directed by Fazil, starring Vineeth, Shobana, Mukesh, Lakshmi, Sanup Kumar and Sreenivasan. The film was dubbed in Tamil as Murattu Kaadhal.

Plot

Merlin, a successful pop singer, gets stalked by an eccentric fan - Ramesh; whose strange obsession he himself cannot explain. Officer Babu Mohan unravels the mystery once he finds out how her songs awaken memories from Ramesh's traumatic childhood...

Cast 
Vineeth as Ramesh
Shobana as Merlin Fernandez 
Mukesh as Commissioner Babu Mohan 
Sreenivasan as CI Appukkuttan
Lalu Alex as Thomas Jacob
Lakshmi as Yasodhamma
Sanup Kumar 
N. F. Varghese as Abdulla
Anjali Nair
V. K. Sreeraman

Soundtrack 
The music was composed by Johnson, with lyrics by Shibu Chakravarthy.

Reception 
The movie was well received by the audience and critics praised the performance of Vineeth as the stalker of Merlin (played by Shobhana).

References

External links

1994 films
1990s Malayalam-language films
Films directed by Fazil